This is a progressive list of men's association footballers who have held or co-held the world record for international caps, beginning with Billy MacKinnon, the only man to play in all of Scotland's first seven internationals.

Criteria
The criteria used by national FAs in considering a match as a full international were not historically fixed. Particularly for the early decades, and until more recently for FAs outside UEFA and CONMEBOL, counts of caps were often considered unreliable. RSSSF and IFFHS have spent much effort trying to produce definitive lists of full international matches, and corresponding data on players' international caps and goals. Using this data, the following records can be retrospectively produced. Note that, at the time, these records may not have been recognised.

One point of note is that early matches by the England Amateur side were played against the full national side of opponents. These matches are counted as full internationals by the IFFHS and the opposing FAs, though not by the (English) FA. This affects Vivian Woodward, who won 23 full caps and 30 amateur caps; the IFFHS considers him as the record-holder from 1909, when his total of 31 caps included 11 amateur matches.

Before 1977, the world record holder was always European, except when Ángel Romano narrowly overtook Imre Schlosser. After 1977, many sources, including FIFA and the Guinness Book of Records, reported later European cap records as world records.  Subsequent validation of the caps claimed by Cha Bum-Kun, Hussein Saeed, Majed Abdullah, and Adnan Al Talyani has shown that, even stripping out ineligible matches, these players exceeded the contemporary European counts. Similarly, Hossam Hassan of Egypt was reported as having broken Lothar Matthäus' putative record of 150 caps in 2001.

In August 2021, four retired Malaysian internationals were retrospectively admitted to the FIFA Century Club, with Soh Chin Ann's 1984 appearance against North Yemen recognised as a record 195th cap, thereby annulling the putative record totals achieved in intervening decades by Cha, Saeed, Abdullah, Al Talyani, Claudio Suárez, Mohamed Al-Deayea, Ahmed Hassan, and Bader Al Mutawa.

On 14 June 2022, Bader Al-Mutawa surpassed Soh Chin Ann's record of 195 matches recognised by FIFA and he become the men's all-time record appearance holder with 196 caps.

On 10 December 2022, Cristiano Ronaldo equalled Al Mutawa's record of 196 matches recognised by FIFA in the 2022 FIFA World Cup quarter-finals against Morocco in Qatar.

The women's international cap record is 354, held by Kristine Lilly of the United States, who exceeded Soh's total with her 196th cap against Norway in the 2000 Algarve Cup.

World record

See also
 Progression of association football caps European record
 Progression of association football caps Oceania record
 Progression of association football caps South American record
 List of men's footballers with 100 or more international caps
 List of women's footballers with 100 or more international caps
 List of world association football records

References

General
 Players with 100+ Caps and 30+ International Goals RSSSF

Specific

Association football record progressions